Sergey Albertovich Glazkov (born 9 August 1967) is a professional association football manager from Russia and a former Soviet player.

External links

1967 births
Living people
Soviet footballers
Russian football managers
FC Dynamo Stavropol players
Association football midfielders
FC Spartak Kostroma players